Ocorono, or Rocorona, is an extinct language of Bolivia, possibly of the Chapacuran family.

Birchall (2013) presents an in-depth analysis of surviving Rocorona texts from Jesuit missions in Bolivia, namely the Lord's Prayer, Ave Maria, and Nicene Creed. The texts have also been analyzed by Georges de Crequi-Montfort and Paul Rivet (1913).

References

Sources
Birchall, A look at the Rokorona language

Chapacuran languages